The Karla Caves, Karli Caves, Karle Caves or Karla Cells, are a complex of ancient Buddhist Indian rock-cut caves at Karli near Lonavala, Maharashtra. It is just 10.9 Kilometers away from Lonavala. Other caves in the area are Bhaja Caves, Patan Buddhist Cave, Bedse Caves and Nasik Caves.
The shrines were developed over the period – from the 2nd century BCE to the 5th century CE. The oldest of the cave shrines is believed to date back to 160 BCE, having arisen near a major ancient trade route, running eastward from the Arabian Sea into the Deccan. 

The group at Karla is one of the older and smaller of the many rock-cut Buddhist sites in Maharashtra, but is one of the best-known because of the famous "Grand Chaitya" (Cave 8), which is the largest and most completely preserved" chaitya hall of the period, as well as containing unusual quantities of fine sculpture, much of it on a large scale.

Many traders, Western Satraps of Saka origin and Satavahana rulers made grants for construction of these caves.  Karli's location in Maharashtra places it in a region that marks the division between North India and South India. Buddhists, having become identified with commerce and manufacturing through their early association with traders, tended to locate their monastic establishments in natural geographic formations close to major trade routes so as to provide lodging houses for travelling traders. Today, the cave complex is a protected monument under the Archaeological Survey of India.

Affiliation
The caves were historically associated with the Mahāsāṃghika sect of Buddhism which had great popularity in this region of India, as well as wealthy patronage. The caves house a Buddhist monastery dating back to the 2nd century BC. The monastery was once home to two 15-meter grand pillars outside the chaitya. Now only one of these remains, and the remaining space is occupied by a temple dedicated to the goddess Ekveera, who is worshipped most notably by the Aagri and Koli community of Mumbai.

Architecture

The caves are among a large numbers of similar caves excavated in the Sahyadri Hills in the early 1st millennium CE. There are altogether 16 caves in the group, with 3 of them being Mahayana caves. Most of the caves are lenas, with the major exception being the Great Chaitya, Cave No. 8.

Great Chaitya cave
The main cave, called the Great Chaitya cave, or Cave No.8, features a large, intricately carved chaitya, or prayer hall, dating back to 120 CE. The hall features sculptures of both males and females, as well as animals such as lions and elephants.

Patrons

This Great Chaitya cave, the largest in South Asia, was constructed between 50 and 70 CE, and 120 CE, during the reign of the Western Satraps ruler Nahapana, who recorded the dedication of the cave in an inscription. Numerous donors, mainly local merchants, several of them Yavanas, and Buddhist monks and nuns provided donations for the construction of the chaitya cave, as recorded by their dedicatory inscriptions. An inscription among the sculpted decorations at the left end of the veranda mentions the completion of the cave by a local merchant or banker (a "setthi") named Bhutapala, from Vaijayanti. The completion of the cave mentioned by Bhutapala may refer to the ornate sculptures of the veranda, during the final phase of decoration. About a generation after Nahapana, the Satavahana ruler Vasishthiputra Pulumavi (130-159 CE) also left a dedicatory inscription.

Chronology

The Great Chaitya cave of Karla follows, but improves upon, several other Chaitya caves which had been built in Western India under royal sponsorship. It is thought that the chronology of these early Chaitya Caves is as follows: first Cave 9 at Kondivite Caves, then Cave 12 at the Bhaja Caves and Cave 10 of Ajanta Caves, around the 1st century BCE. Then, in chronological order: Cave 3 at Pitalkhora, Cave 1 at Kondana Caves, Cave 9 at Ajanta, which, with its more ornate designs, may have been built about a century later, Cave 18 at Nasik Caves, and Cave 7 at Bedse Caves, to finally culminate with the "final perfection" of the Great Chaitya at Karla Caves.

Characteristics
The chaitya follows the usual pattern for the period, but is unusually large. It is exceptional for preserving original elements in wood: the prominent lateral ribs and other roof timbers, and the umbrella over the stupa.  The chaitya hall only survives in rock-cut examples, but these replicate in stone the form of examples in wood and thatch.  In most rock-cut chaityas, the roof timbers are replicated in stone, to considerable visual effect, but in others actual timber was used, for purely aesthetic rather than structural reasons.  In most of these cases the timber has long decayed away, as for example in the chaitya at Cave 3, Kanheri Caves.  Here, although some were replaced under Lord Curzon in the 19th century, most are original. 

R. C. Majumdar quoting James Fergusson explains:

Main inscriptions
Nahapana
An important dedicatory inscription relates to Nahapana on the lintel to the right of the entrance of the Great Chaitya (Valurak is thought to be an ancient name for Karla Caves):

Yavana (Greek) donors

There are also inscriptions by private donors, who contributed parts of the Great Chaitya, including self-described Yavana (Asiatic Greek or Indo-Greek) donors, who donated six of the pillars, although their names are Buddhist names. They account for nearly half of the known dedicatory inscriptions on the pillars of the Chaitya.

 3rd pillar of the left row:
"(This) pillar (is) the gift of the Yavana Sihadhaya from Dhenukataka"
 4th pillar of the left row:
"Of Dhamma, a Yavana from Dhenukakata"
 9th pillar of the left row:
"(This) pillar (is) the gift of the Yavana Yasavadhana from Denukakata"
 5th pillar of the right row:
"This pillar is the gift of the Yavana Vitasamghata from Umehanakata"
 13th pillar of the right row:
"(This) pillar (is) the gift of the Yavana Dhamadhaya from Denukakata"
 15th pillar of the right row:
"(This) pillar (is) the gift of the Yavana Chulayakha from Dhenukakata". Next to the inscription is a Buddhist Swastika.

The city of Dhenukakata is thought to be Danahu near the city of Karli. It is said by another donor in another inscription that it has a "vaniya-gama" (A community of merchants).

The Yavanas are also known for their donation of a complete cave at the Nasik Caves (cave No.17), and for their donations with inscriptions at the Junnar caves.

Sri Pulumayi

On the lintel to the left of the main entrance to the Great Chaitya, facing the inscription of Nahapana and posterior to it by a generation, there is also an inscription by Satavahana ruler Sri Pulumayi, that is, Vasishthiputra Pulumavi (130-159 CE):

Architectural parallels

The pillars of the Chaitya at Karla are most similar to the pillars of Vihara No.10, at Nasik Caves, also built by Ushavadata, the son-in-law of Nahapana ("Ushavadata, son of Dinika, son-in- law of king Nahapana, the Kshaharata Kshatrapa, (...) has caused this cave to be made and these cisterns."). The proportions and general layout are similar, as are the various architectural elements, including the shape of the bells, the framed toruses, the bases, the capitals and they supporting animals and human figures. These points to a contemporaneity of the Karla Chaitya and the Nahapana vihara at Nasik, circa 70-120 CE. 

On the contrary, the pillars of Nasik vihara No.3 built by the mother of Gautamiputra Satakarni circa 150 CE, depart from the elegant shapes and simplicity of the pillars at Karla and Vihara No.10. They are more similar to those of the Chaitya at Kanheri, built by Yajna Sri Satakarni circa 170 CE.

Other Chaityas and Viharas

Within the complex are a great many other carved chaityas, as well as viharas, or dwelling places for the caves' monks. A notable feature of these caves is their arched entrances and vaulted interiors. Names of donors are inscribed on pillars in Brahmi script in these caves. The outside facade has intricate details carved into it in an imitation of finished wood. The central motif is a large horseshoe arch. There is an Ashokan pillar at the front, with a closed stone facade and torana in between.

One of the Vihara cells bears an inscription of the Satavahana ruler Vasishthiputra Pulumavi (130-159 CE).

Later imitations
Several Chaitya Caves were built in imitation of the Great Chaitya at Karla. This is especially the case of the Great Chaitya at Kanheri, in the northern suburb in Mumbai, probably built during the reign of Yajna Sri Satakarni (circa 150 CE). According to Fergusson, it is certain that the plan of the Chaitya Cave at Kanheri is a literal copy of that at Karle, but the architectural details show exactly the same difference in style as is found between Cave 17 (period of Nahapana circa 115 CE) and Cave 3 (period of Sri Pulumavi, circa 170 CE) at the Nasik Caves.

Some caves at Ajanta, such as Cave 19, built in the 5th century CE, were also modeled after the Karla Great Chaitya.

Cave painting
In Great Chaitya cave, there is a painting on the top backside of 10th pillar right side of the entrance. One has to use mobile light to see the painting.

See also

 Bhaja Caves
 Bedse Caves

References

External links

 Archaeological Survey of India, "Karla Caves" 
 Karla Caves - Ancient Buddhist rock-cut cave 
 Flonnet.com article on caves of Western India
 Kanheri Caves Decoded – YouTube
 Inscriptions at the Karla Caves
 Epigraphia Indica Vol. 7 Karle Cave inscription p.47ff
 Kevin Standage, An Indian Travel Photography Blog (Karla caves)
 Photodharma photographs

Lonavala-Khandala
Caves of Maharashtra
Buddhist temples in India
Tourist attractions in Pune district
Buddhist monasteries in India
Buddhist caves in India
Indian rock-cut architecture
Former populated places in India
Buddhist pilgrimage sites in India
Caves containing pictograms in India